Stoned may refer to:
 Substance intoxication, particularly cannabis intoxication
 Petrification, process of organic matter turning into stone
 Stoning, a form of execution performed by throwing stones at the victim
 Stoning (metalworking)
 Stoned (computer virus), a boot-sector virus created in 1987

Arts and entertainment 
 Stoned (TV special), a 1981 ABC Afterschool Special episode starring Scott Baio
 Stoned (film), a 2005 film about Brian Jones, one of the founders of The Rolling Stones
 "Stoned" (Dido song), a 2003 song and single by Dido
 "Stoned" (Rolling Stones song), a 1963 song by The Rolling Stones
 "Stoned" (Puddle of Mudd song), a 2010 single by the band Puddle of Mudd
 "Stoned", a 1999 song by Smash Mouth from the album Astro Lounge
 Stoned, Part I, a 2003 album by Lewis Taylor
 Stoned, Part II, a 2004 album by Lewis Taylor
 Stoned (Acid Witch album), 2010
 Lapidation (album), a 2007 album by composer and keyboardist Anthony Coleman
 Stoned, a 1998 autobiography by Andrew Loog Oldham
 Stoned: Photographs & treasures from life with the Rolling Stones, a 2019 autobiography by Jo Wood

See also 
 
 
 Stone (disambiguation)